So Cosmo is an American reality television series that premiered on February 8, 2017, on the E! cable network. The show follows the personal and professional lives of several young people working for Cosmopolitan, an American magazine for women.

Production  
The series was announced on December 13, 2016.

The cast list was announced on February 3, 2017.

On August 19, 2017, a fan asked cast member Evan Betts on Instagram if the show would be returning, he replied "unfortunately not, but that's okay".

Cast 
Joanna Coles - Chief Content Officer

Leah Wyar - Executive beauty director

Steven Brown - Bookings director

Tiffany Reid - Senior fashion editor

Diandra Barnwell - Brand coordinator

Evan Betts - Fitness contributor

James DeMolet - Senior fashion editor

Adam Mansuroglu - Fashion editor

Michele Promaulayko - New editor in chief

Matthew Hussey - Relationship contributor

Broadcast
Internationally, the series premiered in Australia on the local version of E! on February 14, 2017.

The show premiered on February 14, 2017 in New Zealand on the E! Network.

The show premiered in United Kingdom in March 2017.

Soundtrack
The theme song is "ARMS CTRL" performed by PANGS.

Episodes

References

External links 
 
 

2010s American reality television series
2017 American television series debuts
2017 American television series endings
English-language television shows
E! original programming
Television series by Bunim/Murray Productions